Gianluca Hossmann (born 25 March 1991) is a German–Swiss football player who last played as a defender for FC Seefeld Zürich.

Career
He made his 2. Bundesliga debut for MSV Duisburg on 26 September 2015 against Union Berlin.

References

External links

1991 births
Living people
People from Winterthur
Swiss men's footballers
Association football defenders
MSV Duisburg players
MSV Duisburg II players
2. Bundesliga players
Grasshopper Club Zürich players
FC Biel-Bienne players
Swiss Super League players
Swiss Challenge League players
Swiss people of German descent
Sportspeople from the canton of Zürich